A Melt-Freeze Crust or Rain Crust is a discontinuity between snow layers which can lead to avalanches.  

The layer can be created in two ways:
A temperature high enough to allow surface snow to melt, creating a layer of melt water which may later re-freeze.  
Rain falling and freezing on the surface of existing snow, also creating a frozen layer.  

This layer is brittle, smooth and slippery, and does not bond with snow layers above it, allowing the overlying slab of snow to move down the mountain under gravity when disturbed or if the accumulated snowfall exceeds a critical mass. The initial slab may be as large as 10,000m² and 10 metres thick.

References

Snow